Honcopampa or Joncopampa (possibly from Ancash Quechua hunqu swamp, pampa plain) is an archaeological site in Peru. Hunqupampa is considered one of the most important archaeological sites of the Callejón de Huaylas. It lies in the little populated place named Hunqupampa (Joncopampa).

References 

Archaeological sites in Ancash Region
Archaeological sites in Peru
Populated places in the Ancash Region